Simon of Cremona (d. in Padua, 1390) was a writer and well-known preacher of the Augustinian Order.  He worked during the late fourteenth century in Northern Italy, especially in Venice.  Excerpts from his sermons were published under the title of Postilla super Evangliis et Epistolis Omnium Dominicarum.  These excerpts include:  "In Quatuor Libros Sententiarum", "Quaestiones de indulgentia Portiunculaee" and "Quaestiones de sanguine Christi".

1390 deaths
Augustinian friars
Year of birth unknown